Elizabeth Hopley is a British actress and writer.

She has appeared in several audio plays based on the BBC science fiction television series Doctor Who. Her first appearance was as the Eighth Doctor’s companion Gemma Griffin in Terror Firma. She also portrayed Yarvell, the sister of Davros, in the I, Davros mini-series and Dorothea Waddingham in the 2005 film Pierrepoint.

Hopley was born in Liverpool and trained at RADA. Her film and television work includes the recent TV adaptation of Andrea Levy's The Long Song and ITV's 2017 drama series Little Boy Blue, the film adaptation of Jane Eyre directed by Sin Nombres Cary Fukunaga, The Last Hangman, Channel 4's adaptation of Any Human Heart, Randall and Hopkirk, the BBC's The Day of the Triffids with Joely Richardson and Eddie Izzard, ITV's adaptation of The Suspicions of Mr Whicher starring Paddy Considine and The Thirteenth Tale for the BBC.

Notable theatre work includes the RSC's "Roaring Girls" Season and the original cast of Cheek by Jowl'''s world tour of 'Tis Pity She's a Whore. Most recently, she played Kate in the AFTLS's 2018 USA tour of The Taming of the Shrew.

Among her written work is the one-woman play Pramface, which explored the consequences of reality television and labelling people as chavs.

Her radio plays have included The Elizabethan Beauty Law (which starred Annette Badland as Queen Elizabeth), The Cenci Family (nominated for a Sony Radio Academy Award) for BBC Radio 4 and Salome (which starred Ian Brooker, Florence Hoath and Kenneth Cranham) for BBC Radio 3.

In 2007 she voiced the Mantasphid Queen in the Doctor Who animated adventure The Infinite Quest. She was recently commissioned to write the screenplay "Killing Clovis Dardentor", an updated film adaptation of Jules Verne's Clovis Dardentor for www.buyacredit.com. In 2011 she appeared as Harriet Gollop in the television film The Suspicions of Mr Whicher for ITV.

She appeared  as Margaret Thatcher in The Audience, written by The Crowns Peter Morgan at the Nuffield (City) Theatre, Southampton (24 May22 June 2019).

Big Finish Productions

Hopley's work for Big Finish Productions includes:Terror Firma – actressNight Thoughts – actressThe Veiled Leopard - actressThe Goddess Quandary - actressScorpius - actressFear – actressConversion - actressTelos - actressWildthyme at Large - actressThe Devil in Ms Wildthyme - actressI, Davros: Innocence - actressI, Davros: Purity - actressI, Davros: Guilt - actressLand of Wonder - actressDark Shadows: Kingdom of the Dead - actressShort Trips: The Centenarian - writerShort Trips: Snapshots - writerShort Trips: Defining Patterns - writerDark Shadows: The Carrion Queen - writer and actressTorchwood: "The Dying Room" - writerClass (Big Finish series): "The Creeper" - writer and actressTime Lord Victorious (Doctor Who audio): "Mutually Assured Destruction" - writerThe Tenth Doctor & River Song (Doctor Who audio): "Precious Annihilation" - writerDalek Universe 3'': "The First Son" - writer

References

External links
 

Alumni of RADA
English voice actresses
English television actresses
English stage actresses
Living people
Actresses from Liverpool
English dramatists and playwrights
British women dramatists and playwrights
English women writers
Writers from Liverpool
Year of birth missing (living people)